Christian Bracconi (born 25 November 1960) is a French-Italian former footballer who played as a forward, and a current manager of R.E. Virton. During his playing days, Bracconi played for SC Bastia in Ligue 1 and Ligue 2.

Playing career
Bracconi started his career in Ligue 1 with SC Bastia, whom he played for from 1980 to 1983. After spending three seasons with Bastia, Bracconi signed for Racing Besançon in Ligue 2. While at Besançon Bracconi enjoyed the best time of his career in which he scored 20 goals in his three seasons with the club in the second division. He then made the move back to Ligue 1 with FC Metz where he stayed for two seasons before moving back to Ligue 2 with former club SC Bastia. In 1991, after spending three seasons with Bastia, Bracconi retired from professional football.

Coaching career
On 4 November 2013, after Ligue 1 club AC Ajaccio sacked Fabrizio Ravanelli, Bracconi was made interim manager of the club. His first match in charge was on 9 November 2013 against Toulouse in which his side took the lead early in the 7th minute through Paul Lasne before giving away the equaliser in the 42nd minute as the match ended 1–1. His first league victory as manager of the club eventually came on 8 February 2014 against Rennes in which his side won 3–1. In October 2014, Bracconi was dismissed.

On 13 June 2015, Bracconi was appointed as manager of Championnat National club CA Bastia. He was dismissed in November, with the club in last place. In May 2016, he became assistant to his former Metz teammate Albert Cartier at Sochaux, and left a year later at the end of his contract.

In November 2017, Bracconi moved abroad to Tubize in the Belgian First Division B, as assistant to Sadio Demba, and became manager days later. He suffered relegation in his first year but the club were reinstated due to the administrative relegation of Lierse, and his contract was renewed. He resigned in June 2019 after another descent.

On 5 December 2019, Bracconi returned to Belgium's second tier with R.E. Virton, succeeding the German Dino Toppmöller.

Managerial statistics
.

References

1960 births
Living people
Footballers from Constantine, Algeria
SC Bastia players
FC Metz players
Association football forwards
Ligue 1 players
Ligue 2 players
French footballers
French football managers
AC Ajaccio managers
Racing Besançon players
Pieds-Noirs
French expatriate football managers
Expatriate football managers in Belgium
French expatriate sportspeople in Belgium
Ligue 1 managers
Ligue 2 managers
INF Vichy players
FC Metz non-playing staff